Donnchadh Conallagh Ua Conchobair (died 1204) was a  Prince of Connacht, Ireland.

Donnchadh was one of the seven sons of King Conchobar Maenmaige Ua Conchobair of Connacht (assassinated 1189). He was a grandson of King of Ireland, Ruaidrí Ua Conchobair.

The Annals of the Four Masters, sub anno 1207, state that "Egneghan O'Donnell set out upon a predatory excursion into Fermanagh, and seized upon cows; but a considerable muster of the men of Fermanagh pursued him, and slew O'Donnell, Lord of Tirconnell, tower of the warlike prowess and hospitality of the province in his time; and some others of his nobility were slain along with him. The following were the nobles who fell on this occasion: Gillareagh, the son of Kellagh O'Boyle; Donough Conallagh, the son of Conor Moinmoy; and Mahon, the son of Donnell Midheach (i.e. the Meathian) O'Conor. Many other heroes fell besides these."

Sources
Annals of Ulster
Annals of the Four Masters
Annals of Connacht
O'Byrne, Emmet. War, Politics and the Irish of Lenister 1156-1606, 2004.

1207 deaths
Medieval Gaels from Ireland
13th-century Irish people
People from County Galway
Donnchadh
Year of birth unknown